Lake Avenue is a proposed Tri-Rail Coastal Link Green Line station in Lake Worth, Florida, United States. The station is slated for construction south of Lake Avenue between South F Street and South G Street.

References

External links
 Proposed site in Google Maps Street View

Lake Worth Beach, Florida
Transportation in Palm Beach County, Florida
Proposed Tri-Rail stations